Egypt–Poland relations refers to the relationship between Egypt and Poland. Egypt has an embassy in Warsaw whilst Poland has an embassy in Cairo.

History
The mufti of Poland, Jakub Szynkiewicz, one of Poland's famous Muslims, had settled in Egypt when Poland fell to the communists in 1946 and made significant contributions for the moderation of Islam in Egypt , until 1952 coup d'etats when he left to emigrate to the United States.

On May 18, 1948, during the 1948 Arab–Israeli War, Egyptian aircraft bombed a Polish ship in Tel Aviv. The Polish ambassador to Egypt launched a complaint in response.

In September 2021, Poland donated over 100,000 COVID-19 vaccines to Egypt.

See also
 Foreign relations of Egypt
 Foreign relations of Poland 
 Egypt–EU relations

References

 
Poland 
Bilateral relations of Poland